The French Elite Motocross Championship is the premier domestic French Motocross series, sanctioned by the Fédération Française de Motocyclisme.

Due to sponsorship reason, the series has been known as the 24MX Tour since 2016. The premier classes are the Elite MX1 and Elite MX2 but there are also classes for younger riders.

History 
The French Elite Motocross Championship has existed as the highest level of domestic motocross in France since 1949. Yves Demaria holds the highest number of senior titles with 10. The classes within the championship have evolved over time in line with what has been seen in the sport around the world.

Event Format 
Rounds of the French Elite Motocross Championship typically have a single day format. Qualifying takes place in a morning in the form of timed practice sessions, with the two points paying races taking place in the afternoon. If a class has more than 40 entries, the timed practice sessions are split into two groups.

Points are awarded to finishers of the main races, in the following format:

List of Champions

Pre-1986

References

External links
 

Motorcycle off-road racing series
National championships in France
Motorcycle racing in France
Motocross